Anand Swaroop (born 15 May 1941) is an Indian former cricketer. He played first-class cricket for Delhi and Southern Punjab between 1960 and 1968.

See also
 List of Delhi cricketers

References

External links
 

1941 births
Living people
Indian cricketers
Delhi cricketers
Southern Punjab cricketers
Cricketers from Delhi